{{DISPLAYTITLE:C17H19N5O6S2}}
The molecular formula C17H19N5O6S2 (molar mass: 453.49 g/mol) may refer to:

 Cefcapene
 Cefovecin

Molecular formulas